Marathon is a city in Buena Vista County, Iowa, United States. The population was 230 at the time of the 2020 census. The food writer Richard Olney grew up in Marathon.

Every year in June in Marathon, a marathon and 5k are held. The Marathon is a qualifier for the Boston Marathon.

History
A post office called Marathon has been in operation since 1882. The name of the city commemorates the Battle of Marathon.

Geography
Marathon is located at  (42.860021, -94.981731).

Demographics

2010 census
At the 2010 census there were 237 people in 121 households, including 62 families, in the city. The racial makup of the city was 98.7% White, 0.4% from other races, and 0.8% from two or more races. Hispanic or Latino of any race were 2.5%.

Of the 121 households 17.4% had children under the age of 18 living with them, 43.8% were married couples living together, 3.3% had a female householder with no husband present, 4.1% had a male householder with no wife present, and 48.8% were non-families. 44.6% of households were one person and 21.5% were one person aged 65 or older. The average household size was 1.96 and the average family size was 2.69.

The median age was 49.5 years. 19.4% of residents were under the age of 18; 3% were between the ages of 18 and 24; 20.3% were from 25 to 44; 34.9% were from 45 to 64; and 22.4% were 65 or older. The gender makeup of the city was 51.5% male and 48.5% female.

2000 census
At the 2000 census there were 302 people in 138 households, including 77 families, in the city. The racial makup of the city was 98.01% White, 0.33% Native American, 1.66% from other races. Hispanic or Latino of any race were 2.65%.

Of the 138 households 18.8% had children under the age of 18 living with them, 47.1% were married couples living together, 7.2% had a female householder with no husband present, and 44.2% were non-families. 38.4% of households were one person and 18.1% were one person aged 65 or older. The average household size was 2.19 and the average family size was 2.96.

The age distribution was 24.5% under the age of 18, 3.3% from 18 to 24, 24.2% from 25 to 44, 23.5% from 45 to 64, and 24.5% 65 or older. The median age was 44 years. For every 100 females, there were 100.0 males. For every 100 females age 18 and over, there were 94.9 males.

The median household income was $20,982 and the median family income was $26,042. Males had a median income of $23,750 versus $17,000 for females. The per capita income for the city was $12,751. About 19.0% of families and 22.5% of the population were below the poverty line, including 34.4% of those under the age of eighteen and 17.2% of those sixty five or over.

Education
Marathon is within the Laurens–Marathon Community School District. It was a part of the Marathon Community School District until its consolidation into Laurens–Marathon on July 1, 1976. High school students from Laurens–Marathon have attended Pocahontas Area High School since 2017.

References

Cities in Buena Vista County, Iowa
Cities in Iowa